Remington-Morse Records was a United States based record label from before World War II.

See also
 List of record labels

Defunct record labels of the United States